The British 60 metres athletics champions are only women and the Championships only took place outdoors from 1935 until 1950.  The 60 metres event is now primarily an indoor event.

Past winners

References

60 metres
British